Nasta or NASTA may refer to:

National Student Television Association, United Kingdom
Nasta, manufacturer of the Hit Stix toy musical instrument in the United States in the 1980s